Millie the Model was Marvel Comics' longest-running humor title, first published by the company's 1940s predecessor, Timely Comics, and continuing through its 1950s forerunner, Atlas Comics, to 1970s Marvel. The comic book series deals with Millie Collins, an aspiring model.

Publication history
The series ran 207 issues (cover-dated Winter 1945 to Dec. 1973), a 28-year span that included one of the first Marvel Comics annuals (in 1962), and spin-offs including A Date with Millie, Life with Millie, Mad About Millie and Modeling with Millie. At first a funny career-gal book about New York City model Millie Collins, it very quickly changed into a wider, more slapstick comedy, although for a time becoming a romantic adventure series with all the same characters (#113–153, March 1963 – Aug. 1967) before returning to humor. Both the trademarked cover title and the copyrighted title as per its postal indicia are Millie the Model Comics through issue #94; the cover title then becomes simply Millie the Model, although the copyrighted title did not change to match until issue #144.

The character was created by writer-artist Ruth Atkinson, one of the pioneering women cartoonists in comic books. Following this first issue, subsequent early stories were drawn mostly by Timely staffer Mike Sekowsky.

The character's essential look, however, was the work of future Archie Comics's Dan DeCarlo, who would later create Josie and the Pussycats and other Archie icons. DeCarlo's 10-year run on the series, from #18–93 (June 1949 – Nov. 1959), was succeeded by the team of writer Stan Lee and artist Stan Goldberg, a.k.a. "Stan G.", the main Atlas/Marvel colorist at the time. Goldberg mimicked the house style DeCarlo set, and later went on to work with him at Archie, as did occasional Millie artist Henry Scarpelli. Al Hartley and Ogden Whitney provided an occasional cover.

The occasional backup feature included a four-page "Powerhouse Pepper" story by cartoonist Basil Wolverton in #9, and work by humorist Harvey Kurtzman in #8, 10–11, 13–14, & 16. Lee and Goldberg had Marvel artist and major industry figure Jack Kirby guest-star in a story in #107 (March 1962), though the image itself did not look like Kirby.

Millie became part of the Marvel Universe with Fantastic Four Annual #3 (1965), which chronicled the wedding of Reed Richards and Susan Storm. Fellow humor-comic stars Patsy Walker and Hedy Wolfe, among the sidewalk crowd outside, talk about wanting to catch a glimpse of celebrity Millie, whom they've heard is on the guest list. Alex Ross depicted her at the ceremony when he revisited the wedding in the 1990s miniseries Marvels.

She reappeared in the 1980s as an older character running her own modeling agency and minding her niece, the titular star of writer-artist Trina Robbins' Misty (Dec. 1985 – May 1986), from Marvel's children's-oriented Star Comics imprint. Millie has also appeared in the superhero comics The Defenders #65 (Nov. 1978); Dazzler #34 (Oct. 1985); The Sensational She-Hulk #60 (Feb. 1994); and in the kitschy flashback series The Age of the Sentry #3 (Jan. 2009).

Millie starred alongside Patsy Walker and Mary Jane Watson in a 23-page story "Un-enchanted Evening", by writer Paul Tobin and artist Colleen Coover, in King-Size Spider-Man Summer Special #1 (Oct. 2008). Millie stars in the four-issue miniseries Models, Inc. (Oct. 2009 – Jan. 2010).

Fictional character biography 

Aspiring model Millie Collins of Sleepy Gap, Kansas, moves to New York. She meets photographer Clicker (originally Flicker) Holbrook who arranges an introduction at the Hanover Modelling Agency. She is hired as a model by the agency. At the start of the series her best friend was regular character Toni Turner; later on Toni became a recurring character, and her role as best friend and confidant was Daisy, the agency's wardrobe assistant. She becomes romantically involved with Clicker Holbrook. At one point, she shares an apartment on the East Side of Manhattan with Toni Turner. Near the end of the series, Millie and Daisy shared an apartment.

Throughout the series, redheaded model Chili Storm was Millie's friendly nemesis (Millie: "Sorry I'm late! I just got back from the salon!"  Chili: "Too bad they didn't have time to take you!" Millie [ringing phone drawn in foreground]: "Oh, there's the phone". Chili: "Wow!  I'll bet you can also identify doorbells and auto horns!"). When Millie wasn't around, however, Chili would sometimes speak up for her colleague. Chili starred in her own 1969–1973 spin-off series.

In addition to regular appearances by Millie, Chili, Clicker and Daisy, there were occasional appearances by Howard Hanover, Toni Turner, Marvin, Agnes Ames (in charge of Wardrobe at the modeling agency) and a colleague who helped with agency sets and maintenance, Chili's wealthy boyfriend Reginald Goldmine, and Miss Scrubbley. Very late in the series, Mr. Hanover had a daffy platinum-blonde assistant, Dolly. Millie's parents are Nancy and Henry Collins. She has one younger brother, Henry Collins Jr.

Power and abilities 
Millie Collins has no superpowers. She is a talented model, actress, and businesswoman. Across the Millie the Model comic book series, Millie's beauty allows her to attract everyone's attention.

Reception

Critical reception

Volumes

Millie the Model - 1945 
In 1968, the Millie the Model comic book series won an Alley Award for "Best Romance Comic" at the New York Comic Art Convention.

Jonathan Bagamery of CBR.com ranked the Millie the Model comic book series 1st in their "10 Best Romance Comics From Marvel Comics" list: "Despite what her rivals might think, the true reigning queen of romance at Marvel is Millie the Model. Ruth Atkinson, co-creator of Patsy Walker, designed Millie for Timely Comics in 1945. For nearly 30 years, Millie's long-running search for romance crossed multiple genres. The popular title spawned several spin-offs, including Life with Millie and Modeling with Millie. Iconic Archie artist Dan DeCarlo had an influential ten-year run on Millie the Model, and the series also featured art from Al Hartley and Stan Goldberg. When Millie ended in December 1973, her finale signaled the end of Marvel's romance boom. Millie and other beloved characters from the Golden Age occasionally make memorable appearances in Marvel's superhero titles. But the House of Ideas has never repeated its early success with tales of true love".

Accolades 
 In 2011, Comics Buyer's Guide ranked Millie Collins 90th in their "100 Sexiest Women in Comics" list.
 In 2020, CBR.com ranked Millie Collins 6th in their "Marvel: 10 Best Golden Age Heroines" list.

Spin-offs and annuals 
 A Date with Millie #1–7 (Oct. 1956 – Aug. 1957)
 A Date with Millie vol. 2, #1–7 (Oct. 1959 – Oct. 1960), continues as
 Life With Millie #8–20 (Dec. 1960 – Dec. 1962), continues as
 Modelling with Millie #21–54 (Feb. 1963 – June 1967)
 Mad about Millie #1–17 (April 1969 – Dec. 1970)
 Mad about Millie Annual #1 (1971)
 Chili, Millie's Rival #1–26 (May 1969 – Dec. 1973)
 Chili, Millie's Rival Special #1 (1971)
 Millie the Model Annual #1–10 (1962–1971), continues as
 Queen-Size Millie the Model #11-12 (1974–1975)

15 Love 
In 2003, Marvel's then-president, Bill Jemas, told the press there were plans to reimagine Millie as a 15-year-old tennis player for a comic-book series called 15 Love, to be targeted at teenaged girls. The possibility of a Millie movie was also mentioned at that time. 15 Love was eventually published in 2011. Written by Andi Watson, it featured Millie Collins' niece, Millie 'Mill' Collins, the lowest-ranking student at the Wayde Tennis Academy, who is about to lose her scholarship and must convince her aunt and others not to give up on her. It ran for three issues, with each as a double-sized 56-page story.

In other media
 A 1986 Off-Broadway musical, Dial "M" For Model by John Epperson, inspired by Millie but not a direct adaptation, was staged at LaMaMa E.T.C. It featured the female impersonator Lypsinka as Mannequin St. Claire, a character based on Chili.

References

External links
 Atlas Tales: Millie the Model
 The Unofficial Handbook of Marvel Comics Creators
 Millie the Model at Don Markstein's Toonopedia. Archived from the original November 8, 2011
 Independent Heroes from the U.S.A.: Millie the Model Note: Erroneously states the comic started with issue #2.
  Includes obituary for Ruth Atkinson Ford, giving death date of June 1, 1997.

1945 comics debuts
1973 comics endings
American comics characters
Atlas Comics characters
Atlas Comics titles
Comics about women
Comics adapted into plays
Characters created by Ruth Atkinson
Comics characters introduced in 1945
Marvel Comics female characters
Fictional characters from Kansas
Fictional characters from New York City
Fictional models
Marvel Comics titles
Timely Comics characters
Romance comics